Sioux Trail is a township in Divide County, North Dakota, United States, with a population of 29 people, at an elevation of 2,244 feet.

References

Townships in Divide County, North Dakota
Townships in North Dakota